Prionapteryx selenalis is a moth in the family Crambidae. It is found in Ethiopia.

References

Endemic fauna of Ethiopia
Ancylolomiini
Moths described in 1919